The Botanical Building is an historic building located in San Diego's Balboa Park, in the U.S. state of California. Built for the 1915–16 Panama–California Exposition, it remains one of the largest lath structures in the world. Alfred D. Robinson (1867–1942), founder and president of the San Diego Floral Society, suggested the construction of a lath house as a feature of the Panama–California Exposition, which was to open in the City of San Diego on January 1, 1915.

References

External links
 
 

1915 establishments in California
Balboa Park (San Diego)
Botanical gardens in California
Buildings and structures in San Diego